The 2010 Internationaux de Nouvelle-Calédonie was a professional tennis tournament played on outdoor hard courts. It was part off the 2010 ATP Challenger Tour. It took place in Nouméa, New Caledonia between 3 and 10 January 2010.

Singles main-draw entrants

Seeds

 Rankings are as of December 28, 2009

Other entrants
The following players received wildcards into the singles main draw:
  Grigor Dimitrov
  Ryan Harrison
  Daniel King-Turner
  Nicolas N'Godrela

The following players received entry from the qualifying draw:
  Leon Frost
  Simone Vagnozzi
  Dane Propoggia
  Martin Slanar

Champions

Singles

 Florian Mayer def.  Flavio Cipolla, 6–3, 6–0.

Doubles

 Nicolas Devilder /  Édouard Roger-Vasselin def.  Flavio Cipolla /  Simone Vagnozzi, 5–7, 6–2, [10-8].

External links
Men's Singles Draw
Men's Doubles Draw

2010 ATP Challenger Tour
2010 in French tennis
2010
January 2010 sports events in Oceania
2010 in New Caledonian sport